Peter Lorimer Benson (1946–2011) was a psychologist and CEO/President of Search Institute. He pioneered the developmental assets framework, which became the predominant approach to research on positive facets of youth development. According to the American Psychologist,

Selected works

References

External links
  (TEDx, 2011) video lecture by Benson.
 Pioneer in positive youth development  Background and links on his daughter's web site

1946 births
2011 deaths
20th-century American psychologists
University of Denver alumni
American psychologists